Hicham Arazi was the defending champion, but lost in the quarterfinals this year.

Andrea Gaudenzi won the title, defeating Álex Calatrava 6–4, 5–7, 6–4 in the final.

Seeds

  Albert Portas (quarterfinals)
  Hicham Arazi (quarterfinals)
  Karim Alami (semifinals)
  Andrea Gaudenzi (champion)
  Sjeng Schalken (second round, withdrew)
  Juan Antonio Marín (quarterfinals)
  Jordi Burillo (second round)
  Davide Sanguinetti (second round)

Draw

Finals

Top half

Bottom half

External links
 Association of Tennis Professionals (ATP) – 1998 Grand Prix Hassan II Men's Singles draw

Singles
1998 ATP Tour